LGBT rights in Mexico City are considerably more progressive than the rest of Mexico. On March 4, 2010, it became the first area in Mexico to issue same-sex marriage licenses to same-sex couples.

Legal status of homosexuality
Homosexuality is legal in Mexico City since the country's adoption of the Napoleonic Code (via the brief French occupation of Mexico (1862–67)).

LGBT adoption
Joint legal adoption by same-sex couples is legal in Mexico City since 2010.

Recognition of same-sex unions

Same-sex marriage is legal in Mexico City, having been approved by its Legislative Assembly on 21 December 2009, and signed into law by Head of Government Marcelo Ebrard on 29 December 2009. The law was effective on 4 March 2010.

Civil unions, known as Sociedades de Convivencia and offering some of the rights of marriage, have been legal in the city since November 2006.

Changing legal gender
Transgender persons can change their legal gender and name in Mexico City since August 29, 2008.

Anti-LGBT violence 

Between 1995 and 2005, 126 homosexuals were murdered in Mexico City. Of those, 75 percent were reclaimed by their families. In 10 percent of the cases, families identified the victim but did not reclaim their bodies (which were buried in common graves) and the remaining 5 percent were never identified.

Former assistant attorney for crime victims at the Federal District Attorney General's Office (PGJDF) Barbara Illan Rondero strongly criticized the lack of sensitivity and professionalism on the part of investigators in crimes committed against homosexuals and lesbians:

Alejandro Brito Lemus, director of the news supplement Letra S ("Letter S"), claimed that only four percent of gays and lesbians who suffer from discrimination present their complaints to authorities:

History of LGBT rights

 1569: An official Inquisition (tribunal) was created in Mexico City by Philip II. Homosexuality was a prime concern and the Inquisition inflicted stiff fines, spiritual penances, public humiliations and floggings for what it deemed sexual sins.
 1901 (20 November): Mexico City police raided an affluent drag ball, arresting 42 cross-dressed men;  one was released, allegedly a close relative of President Porfirio Díaz. The resulting scandal (known as the "Dance of the 41 Maricones") received widespread press coverage.
 1959: Mayor Ernesto Uruchurtu closed all gay bars in Mexico City under the guise of "cleaning up vice" (or reducing its visibility).
 1979: The country's first LGBT Pride parade was held in Mexico City.
 1999 (August): The First Meeting of Lesbians and Lesbian Feminists was held in Mexico City. From this meeting evolved an organized effort for expanded LGBT rights in the nation’s capital.
September: Mexico City passed an ordinance banning discrimination based on sexual orientation, the first of its kind in the country.
 2000: Enoé Uranga, an openly lesbian politician, proposed a bill which would have legalized same-sex civil unions in Mexico City. However, the local legislature decided not to adopt the bill after widespread opposition from right-wing groups.
 2006 (9 November): Mexico City legalized same-sex civil unions.
21 December: Mexico City's Legislative Assembly passed a bill legalizing same-sex marriage and adoption by same-sex couples. Eight days later, List of heads of government of the Mexican Federal District (Mayor) Marcelo Ebrard signed the bill into law.
 2010 (4 March): Same-sex marriage law becomes effective in Mexico City.
5 August: The Supreme Court of Justice of the Nation (the highest federal court in the country) voted 9–2 to uphold the constitutionality of Mexico City's same-sex marriage reform. Four days later it upheld the city's adoption law.
 2020 (31 July): Conversion therapies are banned in the city.

References

LGBT rights in Mexico
Mexico City